Big Fun is a compilation album by American jazz trumpeter Miles Davis. It was released by Columbia Records on April 19, 1974, and compiled recordings Davis had made in sessions between 1969 and 1972. Largely ignored in 1974, it was reissued on August 1, 2000, by Columbia and Legacy Records with additional material, which led to a critical reevaluation.

Background and recording 
Big Fun presents music from three phases of Miles Davis's early-seventies "electric" period.

Sides one and four ("Great Expectations/Orange Lady" and "Lonely Fire") were recorded three months after the Bitches Brew sessions and incorporate sitar, tambura, tabla, and other Indian instruments. They also mark the first time since the beginning of Miles Davis's electric period that he played his trumpet with the Harmon mute which had been one of his hallmarks, making it sound much like the sitar. This contributed to creating a very clear and lean sound, highlighting both the high and low registers, as opposed to the busier sound of Bitches Brew which placed more emphasis on the middle and low registers.

"Ife"—named after James Mtume's daughter—was recorded after the 1972 On the Corner sessions, and the framework is similar to tracks from that record. It has a drum and electric bass groove (which in fact at one point breaks down due to mistiming) and a plethora of musicians improvising individually and in combinations over variations on the bassline.

"Go Ahead John"

Recording 

Recorded on March 3, 1970, "Go Ahead John" is an outtake from Davis's Jack Johnson sessions. The recording is a riff and groove-based, with a relatively sparser line-up of Steve Grossman on soprano saxophone, Dave Holland on bass, Jack DeJohnette on drums, and John McLaughlin on guitar with wah-wah pedal. It was one of the rare occasions in which Davis recorded without a musical keyboard. It was recorded in five sections, ranging from three to 13 minutes, which producer Teo Macero subsequently assembled in post-production four years later for Big Fun. DeJohnette provides a funky, complex groove, Holland plays bass with one constant note repeated, and McLaughlin plays in a staccato style with blues and funk elements. According to one music writer, the track's bass parts has "a trancelike drone that maintains" the predominantly Eastern vibe of the album.

Davis's trumpet and McLaughlin's guitar parts were heavily overdubbed for the recording. The overdubbing effect was created by superimposing part of Davis's trumpet solo onto other parts of it, through something Teo Macero calls a "recording loop". Macero later said of this production technique, "You hear the two parts and it's only two parts, but the two parts become four and they become eight parts. This was done over in the editing room and it just adds something to the music [...] I called [Davis] in and I said, 'Come in, I think we've got something you'll like. We'll try it on and if you like it you've got it.' He came in and flipped out. He said it was one of the greatest things he ever heard". DeJohnette's drums were also manipulated by Macero, who used an automatic switcher to have them rattle back and forth between the left and right speakers on the recording. In his book Running the Voodoo Down: The Electric Music of Miles Davis, Davis-biographer Phil Freeman describes this technique as "100 percent Macero" and writes of its significance to the track as a whole, stating:

Composition 
Titled as an exhortation by Davis to McLaughlin, "Go Ahead John" features a basic, blues motif, centered around E and B♭, as well as modulations introduced by Davis into the D♭ scale. The recording begins with McLaughlin's funky wah-wah lines, backing Grossman's sharp, restrained playing, with Davis's first trumpet solo entering at four minutes with scattered ideas. In his book Milestones: The Music and Times of Miles Davis, Jack Chambers writes that the recording's first 11 minutes and its closing four-and-a-half minutes "resemble Willie Nelson [from Jack Johnson] as a head arrangement built on a riff, with the riff sustained this time by McLaughlin's steady wah-wah in the background. Approximately six minutes into it, McLaughlin's guitar solo succeeds Davis's first solo, as the band vamps. Music journalist Todd S. Jenkins writes of this passage in the recording, "Thanks to the then-new wonders of noise gate technology, Jack DeJohnette’s drums and cymbals flit back and forth rapidly from left to right in the mix. With each switch, the guitar’s volume blasts in and out, over and over again, during McLaughlin’s relentlessly acidic solo". Following the passage, an unrelated theme opens with two minutes of a slow blues segment by Davis that is spliced into the recording, accompanied solely by occasional notes from Holland; According to Jack Chambers, Davis's blues solo "becomes a duet with himself by overdubbing, and then builds into a quintet performance lasting ten more minutes". Phil Freeman wrote of this "doubling effect", stating "Miles's two solos fit together perfectly, creating a feel similar to that of New Orleans jazz, with two trumpets weaving intricate, complementary lines around each other".

In Milestones: The Music and Times of Miles Davis, Chambers writes of Davis's segment and the complex production of "Go Ahead John", "In spite of the gimmickry, the blues segment manages to state some old verities in a new context, and state them powerfully. Most jazz listeners can hope that someday Go Ahead John will be unscrambled and re-presented to them as, among other things, an unhurried blues by Davis accompanied only by Holland". Down Beat critic John Ephland interprets the recording to be "Miles' most obvious allusion to the Godfather of Soul, James Brown", adding that "Conjuring up images of Brown's 'I Can't Stand Myself' and 'I Got the Feelin',' from '67 and '68, respectively, 'Go Ahead John' shuffles, swirls, gets down and runs rampant, with some very creative editing, courtesy of producer Teo Macero". Allmusic editor Thom Jurek writes of the recording, "There is no piano. What's most interesting about this date is how it prefigures what would become 'Right Off' from Jack Johnson. It doesn't have the same fire, nor does it manage to sustain itself for the duration, but there are some truly wonderful sections in the piece". In Running the Voodoo Down: The Electric Music of Miles Davis, Phil Freeman calls the recording "one of the best things Miles and Macero created during the 1970s", writing that "It's a singular achievement in production, one that presents Miles in a different light than anything else in his catalog".

Release and reception 

Released on April 19, 1974, by Columbia Records, Big Fun debuted at number 193 on the U.S. Billboard Top LPs chart and sold 50,000 copies in its first week. It ultimately reached number 179 on the chart and number six on Billboards Top Jazz LPs chart. According to Todd S. Jenkins of All About Jazz, "The long, ever-droning, darkly exotic electric music, and in fact the very idea of just four songs taking up four full sides of an album, was not too appealing to critics or the general market at a time when short, sharp disco tunes were beginning to chart like wildfire. So Big Fun received generally weak reviews".

In a positive review, Billboard stated "Much of the existentialism in musical forms that has characterized Miles Davis' recent offerings are embodied in this new album, but Davis has the creativity of mind and expertise of profession to break away from the conventional and still remain an exciting, interesting, innovative and acceptable artist. This album is in that genre". Bob Palmer of Rolling Stone commented that "essentially Big Fun is the most consistently appealing, varied and adventurous Miles Davis album since Live/Evil, commands attention as such, and will doubtless give Davis's many imitators something to think about".

Legacy and reappraisal 

In Christgau's Record Guide: Rock Albums of the Seventies (1981), Robert Christgau believed three of the album's "side-long" compositions "wind down prematurely", but "for the most part this is uncommonly beautiful stuff, and it gets better". He singled out "Lonely Fire" as a highlight, writing that "after meandering at the beginning [it] develops into lyrical mood music reminiscent in spirit and fundamental intent of Sketches of Spain". The Rolling Stone Album Guide (2004) said the album "defies easy categorization, although its dark, moody tracks boast a strong undercurrent of Indian classical rhythms in addition to the expected swathes of rock and funk".

Alternative Press called the album "essential....colorful and exotic" and wrote that it represents "the high water mark of his experiments in the fusion of rock, funk, electronica and jazz". The Penguin Guide to Jazz described it as "an entertaining simulation of a top-drawer R&B band, just about pushed into the jazz zone", with the key elements of Davis's "electronic" sound. Stylus Magazines Edwin C. Faust commented that "a world without this music would be a considerably emptier place" and cited it as Davis's "greatest achievement" with regard to an album's "overall effect". Faust viewed that critics who originally found it "scattered" and "unfocused" might not have without "the knowledge of recording dates and band line-ups", while elaborating on its significance to Davis's catalogue:

Down Beat critic John Ephland commented that "there is indeed a sense of adventure, of taking chances with so much talent, and with such skeletal designs", adding that "Big Fun reinforces the notion that Miles' primary contributions to music have come via orchestrating, organizing, enabling. How this music was put together proves to be as interesting as any solo or ensemble work [...] Incidentally, the digital sound quality is consistently high throughout". AllMusic editor Thomas Jurek was less enthusiastic. He found "some outstanding playing and composing here", but criticized "the numerous lineups and uneven flow of the tracks", writing that "despite the presence of classic tracks like Joe Zawinul's 'Great Expectations', Big Fun feels like the compendium of sources it is".

Track listing
All compositions by Miles Davis, except where noted.

Original release

Double CD edition

Note: Some issues mistakenly omit "Muhler Laranja" (better known as "Orange Lady"), along with its composer, from the liner notes and tracklist. However, the piece does appear on all editions of the album.

Personnel

Musicians

 "Great Expectations/Orange Lady" (19 November 1969 – Columbia Studio E)

 Miles Davis – trumpet
 Steve Grossman – soprano saxophone
 Bennie Maupin – bass clarinet
 John McLaughlin – electric guitar
 Khalil Balakrishna – electric sitar
 Bihari Sharma – tabla, tamboura
 Herbie Hancock – electric piano
 Chick Corea – electric piano
 Ron Carter – double bass
 Harvey Brooks – Fender bass guitar
 Billy Cobham – drums
 Airto Moreira – percussion

 "Ife" (12 June 1972 – Columbia Studio E)

 Miles Davis – electric trumpet with wah wah
 Sonny Fortune – soprano saxophone, flute
 Bennie Maupin – clarinet, flute
 Carlos Garnett – soprano saxophone
 Lonnie Liston Smith – electric piano
 Harold I. Williams Jr. – electric piano
 Michael Henderson – electric bass
 Al Foster – drums
 Billy Hart – drums
 Badal Roy – tabla
 James Mtume – African percussion

 + "Recollections" (6 February 1970 – Columbia Studio B)

 Miles Davis – trumpet
 Wayne Shorter – soprano saxophone
 Bennie Maupin – bass clarinet
 John McLaughlin – electric guitar
 Joe Zawinul – electric piano (left)
 Chick Corea – electric piano (right)
 Dave Holland – electric bass guitar
 Billy Cobham – triangle
 Jack DeJohnette – drums
 Airto Moreira – cuíca, percussion

 + "Trevere" (28 November 1969 – Columbia Studio E)

 Miles Davis – trumpet
 Steve Grossman – soprano saxophone
 Bennie Maupin – bass clarinet
 Chick Corea – electric piano
 Larry Young – organ, celeste
 Khalil Balakrishna – electric sitar
 Bihari Sharma – tamboura
 Harvey Brooks – electric bass guitar
 Dave Holland – double bass
 Jack DeJohnette – drums
 Billy Cobham – drums
 Airto Moreira – cuíca, berimbau

 "Go Ahead John" (3 March 1970 – Columbia Studio E)

 Miles Davis – trumpet
 Steve Grossman – soprano saxophone
 John McLaughlin – electric guitar
 Dave Holland – bass guitar
 Jack DeJohnette – drums

 "Lonely Fire" (27 January 1970 – Columbia Studio B)

 Miles Davis – trumpet
 Wayne Shorter – soprano saxophone
 Bennie Maupin – bass clarinet
 Khalil Balakrishna – sitar, Indian instruments
 Chick Corea – electric piano
 Joe Zawinul – electric piano, Farfisa organ
 Dave Holland – double bass
 Harvey Brooks – Fender bass guitar
 Jack DeJohnette – drums
 Billy Cobham – drums
 Airto Moreira – Indian instruments, percussion

 + "The Little Blue Frog" (28 November 1969 – Columbia Studio E)

 Miles Davis – trumpet
 Steve Grossman – soprano saxophone
 Bennie Maupin – bass clarinet
 John McLaughlin – electric guitar
 Chick Corea – electric piano
 Larry Young – organ, celeste
 Khalil Balakrishna – electric sitar
 Bihari Sharma – tamboura
 Harvey Brooks – electric bass guitar
 Dave Holland – double bass
 Jack DeJohnette – drums
 Billy Cobham – drums
 Airto Moreira – cuíca, berimbau

 + "Yaphet" (19 November 1969 – Columbia Studio E)

 Miles Davis – trumpet
 Steve Grossman – soprano saxophone
 Bennie Maupin – bass clarinet
 John McLaughlin – electric guitar
 Herbie Hancock – electric piano (left)
 Chick Corea – electric piano (right)
 Khalil Balakrishna – electric sitar
 Bihari Sharma – tamboura, tabla
 Harvey Brooks – electric bass guitar
 Ron Carter – double bass
 Billy Cobham – drums, triangle
 Airto Moreira – cuíca, berimbau

Additional personnel

 2-LP original

 Teo Macero – original record producer
 Seth Rothstein – project director
 Frank Laico, Stan Tonkel – original audio engineer
 Russ Payne, Stan Weiss, John Guerriere – original mix engineer
 Steve Berkowitz – A&R for Legacy
 Patti Matheny, Darren Salmieri – A&R coordination
 Corky McCoy – original cover art

 2-CD reissue

 Bob Belden – reissue producer
 Seth Foster – reissue digital remastering at Sony Music Studios, NYC
 Bennie Maupin – reissue main liner notes
 Swing Journal Co., Ltd. Japan – reissue backcover photography
 Uve Kuusik – reissue liner notes photography
 Howard Fritzson – reissue art direction
 Randall Martin – reissue design
 Rachel Dicono – packaging manager
 John Jackson – production assistance

Notes

References

Bibliography

External links 
 Big Fun at Discogs
 Big Fun reviewed at Head Heritage

Miles Davis compilation albums
1974 compilation albums
2000 compilation albums
Columbia Records compilation albums
Legacy Recordings compilation albums
Albums produced by Teo Macero
Jazz fusion compilation albums
Albums arranged by Paul Buckmaster